Takashi Yamamoto is a Japanese pianist who won Silver Medal at the 2006 Gina Bachauer International Piano Competition, a prestigious piano competition held in Salt Lake City, Utah. He shared 4th place in 2005 at the XV International Chopin Piano Competition.

References

Japanese pianists
People from Nagano (city)
Living people
Prize-winners of the International Chopin Piano Competition
Musicians from Nagano Prefecture
Year of birth missing (living people)